Paul P. Prosser (November 7, 1880 – June 26, 1936) was an American politician who served as the Attorney General of Colorado from 1933 to 1936.

He died on June 26, 1936, in Denver, Colorado at age 55.

References

1880 births
1936 deaths
Colorado Attorneys General
Colorado Democrats